Helen Elizabeth McCrory  (17 August 1968 – 16 April 2021) was an English actress. After studying at the Drama Centre London, she made her stage debut in The Importance of Being Earnest in 1990. Other stage roles include playing Lady Macbeth in Macbeth at Shakespeare's Globe, Olivia in Twelfth Night and Rosalind in As You Like It in the West End.

McCrory portrayed Cherie Blair in both The Queen (2006) and The Special Relationship (2010), alongside Michael Sheen who also portrayed husband and Prime Minister Tony Blair in both. She also portrayed Françoise in the film Charlotte Gray (2001), the dark anti-heroine Narcissa Malfoy in the final three Harry Potter films (2009, 2010, 2011), Mama Jeanne in Martin Scorsese's family film Hugo (2011), Clair Dowar in the James Bond film Skyfall (2012), Polly Gray in Peaky Blinders (2013–2019), Emma Banville in Fearless (2017) and Kathryn Villiers in MotherFatherSon (2019).

Early life
McCrory was born on 17 August 1968 in Paddington, London. Her mother, Ann (née Morgans), is a Welsh physiotherapist, and her father, Iain McCrory (born 29 March 1940), is a diplomat from Glasgow; they were married in 1968. She was the eldest of three children.

She was educated at Queenswood School near Hatfield, Hertfordshire, then spent a year living in Italy. Upon her return to Britain, she began studying acting at the Drama Centre in London.

Career
McCrory won third prize at the Ian Charleson Awards for her 1993 performance as Rose Trelawny in Trelawny of the 'Wells' at the National Theatre. In 2002, she was nominated for a London Evening Standard Theatre Award for Best Actress (for playing Elena in Chekhov's Uncle Vanya at the Donmar Warehouse). She was later nominated for a 2006 Laurence Olivier Theatre Award for her role as Rosalind in As You Like It in the West End. In April 2008, McCrory made a "compelling" Rebecca West in a production of Ibsen's Rosmersholm at the Almeida Theatre, London. She appeared in Charles II: The Power and The Passion (2003), as Barbara Villiers, Countess of Castlemaine and in supporting roles in such films as Interview with the Vampire (1994), Charlotte Gray (2001), The Count of Monte Cristo (2002) and Casanova (2005). In The Queen (2006), she played Cherie Blair, a role she reprised in Peter Morgan's follow-up The Special Relationship (2010).

She appeared in a modernised television adaptation of Frankenstein (2007). Her first pregnancy forced her to pull out of Harry Potter and the Order of the Phoenix (2007), in which she had been cast as Bellatrix Lestrange (she was replaced by Helena Bonham Carter). McCrory was later cast as Bellatrix's sister Narcissa Malfoy in Harry Potter and the Half-Blood Prince, released in July 2009. She reprised her role in the final films, Harry Potter and the Deathly Hallows – Part 1 and Harry Potter and the Deathly Hallows – Part 2. She also played the principal villain role of Rosanna Calvierri in the 2010 episode "The Vampires of Venice" of the BBC television series Doctor Who.

McCrory starred in The Last of the Haussmans at the Royal National Theatre, which began 12 June 2012. The production was broadcast to cinemas around the world on 11 October 2012 through the National Theatre Live programme. In 2013, McCrory narrated poetry for The Love Book App, an interactive anthology of love literature developed by Allie Byrne Esiri. Again in 2013, she played Lady Macbeth in Macbeth at the Little Angel Theatre. The same year, she started playing Polly Gray in Peaky Blinders. In 2014, McCrory played the title role in the National Theatre's production of Medea, directed by Carrie Cracknell. Also in 2014, she made a guest appearance on the TV series Penny Dreadful. She returned as a regular for the show's second season, playing the main antagonist. In August 2016, McCrory was confirmed to play Emma Banville in ITV drama series Fearless, which began airing in June 2017.

In 2019, McCrory appeared as Kathryn Villiers in Tom Rob Smith’s MotherFatherSon alongside Richard Gere and Billy Howle. It averaged 2.69 million viewers.

Personal life

On 4 July 2007, McCrory married actor Damian Lewis; the couple had a daughter, Manon, and a son, Gulliver. Their main home was in Tufnell Park, North London, and they had another near Sudbury in Suffolk.

McCrory served as an honorary patron of the London children's charity Scene & Heard. During the COVID-19 pandemic, she and her husband supported Feed NHS, a programme to give food from high-street restaurants to NHS staff, and had raised £1 million for the charity by early April 2020.

Honours
McCrory was appointed an Officer of the Order of the British Empire (OBE) in the 2017 New Year Honours for services to drama.

Death
McCrory died of breast cancer at her home in London on 16 April 2021, aged 52. Announcing the death on Twitter, husband Damian Lewis stated that she had died "peacefully at home, surrounded by a wave of love from friends and family." She had kept her diagnosis private and very few people knew of her illness before her death.

She was filming for series 6 of Peaky Blinders at the time of her death. As she could not complete her scenes, the storyline had to be altered, and the production was forced to reshoot certain parts. Other than Peaky Blinders, her last appearances include the 2016 production of The Deep Blue Sea at the National Theatre, one episode of the show Have I Got News For You in 2019, His Dark Materials in 2020, and the 2020 ITV drama Quiz.

Filmography

Film

Television

Stage

Awards and nominations
Sources:

References

External links

 Helen McCrory at the British Film Institute
 
 
 

1968 births
2021 deaths
20th-century English actresses
21st-century English actresses
Actresses from London
Alumni of the Drama Centre London
Deaths from cancer in England
English film actresses
English people of Scottish descent
English people of Welsh descent
English Shakespearean actresses
English stage actresses
English television actresses
English voice actresses
Officers of the Order of the British Empire
People educated at Queenswood School
People from Paddington
Royal Shakespeare Company members